Raj Kishor Yadav is a Nepalese politician, belonging to the People's Socialist Party. He was Industry, Commerce and Supplies Minister of Nepal since 10 June 2021 but was removed from the post by Supreme Court on 22 June 2021 making the tenure of just 12 days and shortest till date.[3] In the 2017 Nepalese general election he was elected from the Siraha 4 constituency, securing 21144 (40.19%) votes.

References

Nepal MPs 2017–2022
Living people
Members of the 1st Nepalese Constituent Assembly
Rastriya Janata Party Nepal politicians
Madhesi Jana Adhikar Forum, Nepal politicians
People's Socialist Party, Nepal politicians
1973 births
Nepal MPs 2022–present